The Fort Bend Star is a weekly newspaper headquartered in Stafford, Texas in Greater Houston.

It was founded in 1978 by Beverly "Bev" Carter (1941 in Ballinger, Texas - July 6, 2013). Her newspaper included a column written by her, "Bev's Burner." Mike Glenn of the Houston Chronicle wrote that it "mixed homey personal anecdotes with sometimes biting political observations." She often criticized politicians including Governor of Texas Rick Perry and Congressman Tom Delay.

Carter died of cancer on Saturday July 6, 2013. As of that year, her son, Michael Fredrickson, published the newspaper. In 2017 it was purchased by McElvy Vasquez, LLC, with Jonathan McElvy serving as president and Frank Vasquez serving as publisher.

The current editor of The Star is Joe Southern. Contributing writers include Theresa D. McClellan, Donna Hill (News/Features) and Bill McCaughey (Sports).

References

External links
 Fort Bend Star

Newspapers published in Greater Houston
Fort Bend County, Texas
1978 establishments in Texas
Newspapers established in 1978
Weekly newspapers published in Texas